The Honshū alpine conifer forests ecoregion covers  in the high-elevation mountains of central Honshū and the Oshima Peninsula of Hokkaido, Japan. It is a temperate coniferous forest ecoregion in the Palearctic realm.

Flora
Northern Japanese hemlock grow with species of Rhododendron and Menziesia. Maries' fir, Veitch's fir, and Jezo spruce grow in forests with plentiful herbs and ferns in their understories. Sasa grass is very dense in places.

Fauna
Sika deer and Asian black bear inhabit this ecoregion. Significant birds include the rock ptarmigan and the golden eagle.

See also
List of ecoregions in Japan

References

Montane forests
Temperate coniferous forests
Ecoregions of Japan

Forests of Japan
Honshu
Palearctic ecoregions